François Bozizé Yangouvonda (born 14 October 1946) is a Central African politician who was President of the Central African Republic from 2003 to 2013.

Bozizé rose to become a high-ranking army officer in the 1970s, under the rule of Jean-Bédel Bokassa. After Bokassa was ousted, Bozizé served in the government as Minister of Defense from 1979 to 1981 and as Minister of Information from 1981 to 1982. He participated in a failed 1982 coup attempt against President André Kolingba and subsequently fled the country. Years later, he served as Army Chief of Staff under President Ange-Félix Patassé, but he began a rebellion against Patassé in 2001.

Bozizé's forces captured the capital, Bangui, in March 2003, while Patassé was outside the country, and Bozizé took power, ushering in a transitional period of government. He won the March–May 2005 presidential election in a second round of voting, and he was re-elected in the January 2011 presidential election, winning the vote in the first round.

In December 2012, the CAR was plunged into an uprising by rebel forces who condemned the Bozizé government for not honoring peace agreements after the Central African Republic Bush War in 2007. On 24 March 2013, Bozizé fled to Cameroon via the Democratic Republic of the Congo after the rebel forces attacked Bangui and took control of the presidential palace. There, he was housed by Paul Biya, president of Cameroon. On 29 May 2013, an international arrest warrant was issued against Bozizé by the Central African Justice.

Early life and Kolingba's rule
Bozizé was born in the present-day nation of Gabon, a member of the Gbaya people, and attended a military officers' training college in the Central African province of Bouar. He became a second lieutenant in 1969 and a captain in 1975. He was appointed Brigadier General by the Emperor of Central Africa Bokassa I (Jean-Bédel Bokassa) in 1978, after he beat a French noncommissioned officer who had been disrespectful to the Emperor. With General Josyhat Mayomokala, Bozizé ordered military personnel to attack young demonstrators who were asking for their parents' arrears. After Bokassa was ousted by David Dacko in 1979, Bozizé was appointed Minister of Defense after an operation that the French army used to overthrow Bokassa (Operation Barracuda). Following Dacko's ouster by André Kolingba in September 1981, Bozizé was appointed Minister of Information, but fled to the north of the country with 100 soldiers after his involvement in a failed coup attempt led by Ange-Félix Patassé on 3 March 1982, in which he accused Kolingba of treason and proclaimed the change of power on Radio Bangui. He then obtained refuge in France. Bozizé was arrested in Cotonou, Benin in July 1989, and imprisoned and tortured. He was put on trial by Kolingba on charges of helping the coup d'état in May but was acquitted on 24 September 1991 and released from prison on 1 December. He then sought refuge in France, where he remained for nearly two years.

Under pressure to democratize the government during the 1980s, Kolingba had formed a political party and held a referendum, in which he was elected to a six-year term in office as president. After the fall of the Berlin Wall, internal and external pressures eventually forced Kolingba to adopt the beginnings of a democratic approach. In March 1991, he named Édouard Frank Prime Minister but allowed him virtually no power. He also established a commission to revise the constitution in order to promote pluralism.
 
As a result, the donor community severely restricted aid flows pending movement towards democracy putting the country into a vicious cycle in which it could not obtain the resources to pay for an election which would legitimize it sufficiently to obtain a flow of aid. When he was pressured by the international community, via a group of locally represented international donors called GIBAFOR (France, USA, Germany, Japan, EU, World Bank and UN), including a very vocal and eloquent US ambassador to the Central African Republic, Daniel H. Simpson, to hold fair elections. They were assisted by the UN Electoral Assistance Unit and monitored by international observers in 1992 but a lot of the resources came from France. Kolingba had the 1992 election sabotaged as he discovered he was not expected to win the vote and so declared the election invalid getting the Constitutional Council cancel it. Under continued pressure from the donor group the election was rescheduled for September 1993. In the 1993 election, Bozizé ran for the presidency as an independent, receiving 12,159 votes, 1.5% of the total votes cast. Patassé, Abel Goumba and Kolingba received 37.32%, 21.68% and 12.10% of the vote, respectively, but since none of the candidates obtained a majority, a run-off election between the top two candidates — Patassé and Goumba — was held. Patassé defeated Goumba by a 53.49%–46.51% vote and was elected president of the Central African Republic.

Supporting Patassé

For many years Bozizé was considered a supporter of Patassé and helped him suppress army mutinies in 1996 and 1997. Bozizé was named the Armed Forces Chief of Staff.

Bozizé showed no activity against Patassé and frequently crushed revolts against the president.

Against Patassé
On 28 May 2001, a coup was attempted against Patassé and defeated with the help of Libyan troops and Congolese rebels of the Movement for the Liberation of Congo. Afterwards, Bozizé's loyalty was questioned, and in late October 2001 he was dismissed as Army Chief of Staff. Fighting erupted when the government tried to arrest Bozizé on 3 November; after five days of this, government forces aided by Libyan troops captured the barracks where Bozizé was based, and Bozizé fled north to Chad.

Fighting between government forces and Bozizé's rebels continued during 2002. From 25 to 31 October, his forces unsuccessfully attacked on the capital, Bangui; soldiers of the Congolese MLC, which again came to Patassé's aid, were accused of looting and rape.

This period was marked by tensions between Chad and Patassé's government. Patassé's ruling party accused Chadian president Idriss Déby of destabilizing the Central African Republic by supporting Bozizé with men and equipment.

2003 coup, 2005 presidential election and rule

On 15 March 2003, Bozizé finally succeeded in seizing power, with his forces entering Bangui unopposed. Patassé was returning from a meeting in Niger at the time, but could not land because Bozizé's forces controlled the airport. Patassé took refuge in Cameroon and then Togo the next year.

On 23 March, Bozizé appointed Abel Goumba as Prime Minister. In December, he made Goumba Vice-President and appointed Célestin Gaombalet in his place as Prime Minister. Bozizé also suspended the country's 1995 constitution after seizing power, and a new constitution, reportedly similar to the old one, was approved by voters in a referendum on 5 December 2004. After seizing power, Bozizé initially said he would not run in a planned future presidential election, but after the successful constitutional referendum, he announced his intention to stand as a candidate on 11 December:

After thinking thoroughly, and being deeply convinced and keeping in mind the nation's interest, I grasped the deep sense of my people's calls. As a citizen, I'll take my responsibility.

I'll contest the election to achieve the task of rebuilding the country, which is dear to me and according to your wish.

After Bozizé seized power, the Central African Republic Bush War began with the rebellion by the Union of Democratic Forces for Unity (UFDR), led by Michel Djotodia. This quickly escalated into major fighting during 2004. The UFDR rebel forces consisted of five allies, the Groupe d'action patriotique pour la liberation de Centrafrique (GAPLC), the Convention of Patriots for Justice and Peace (CPJP), the People's Army for the Restoration of Democracy (APRD), the Movement of Central African Liberators for Justice (MLCJ), and the Front démocratique Centrafricain (FDC).

On 30 December 2004, Bozizé was one of five candidates approved to run in the presidential election scheduled for early 2005. On 4 January 2005, Bozizé announced that three initially excluded candidates would also be allowed to run, although former president Patassé was not included in either group. In late January, it was announced that more candidates would be permitted to run in the election, bringing the total to 11 and leaving only Patassé barred. The elections were also delayed by one month from the previously scheduled date of 13 February to 13 March.

Bozizé placed first in the 13 March election, taking just under 43% of the vote according to official results. He faced Patassé's last prime minister, Martin Ziguélé, in a second round of voting; this was held on 8 May and according to official results announced on 24 May, he won with 64.6% of the vote. He was sworn in on 11 June.

The National Assembly authorized Bozizé to rule by decree for three months, from 1 January to 31 March 2006; his Prime Minister, Élie Doté, said that this period of rule by decree was successful, enabling Bozizé to take measures to streamline the civil service.

In addition to being president, Bozizé has been Minister of National Defense since taking power. At the end of the transitional period, he retained the defense portfolio when he appointed a new government under Doté in June 2005, and he also kept it in a September 2006 cabinet reshuffle.

In early 2006, Bozizé's government appeared stable. However, Patassé, who was living in exile in Togo, could not be ruled out as a leader of a future uprising. His supporters reportedly were joining or were prepared to join rebel movements in belief that their leader was still the rightful head of state of the country. Further, members of Kolingba's Yakoma tribe in the south posed a potential threat to Bozizé's government because of their widespread boycott of the second round of the legislative elections. Members of the Yakoma dominate the army.

On 13 April 2007, a peace agreement between the government and the UFDR was signed in Birao. The agreement provided for an amnesty for the UFDR, its recognition as a political party, and the integration of its fighters into the army. Further negotiations resulted in an agreement in 2008 for reconciliation, a unity government, and local elections in 2009 and parliamentary and presidential elections in 2010. The new unity government that resulted was formed in January 2009.

Facing a general strike over wage arrears for civil servants in January 2008, Bozizé appointed a new government headed by Faustin-Archange Touadéra, an academic figure who was politically unknown. In that government he kept the defense portfolio, while also appointing his son Francis Bozizé to work under him as Minister-Delegate. Bozizé's sister, Yvonne M'Boïssona, who had been Minister of Tourism, was reappointed to the government as Minister of Water, Forests, Hunting, Fishing, and the Environment. His nephew, Sylvain Ndoutingai, served as Minister of State of Mines, Energy, and Water Resources.

In February 2010, Kolingba died in France. In early March, Bozizé presided over his burial ceremony in Bangui. The same week, Bozizé signed a presidential decree setting the date for the next presidential election which was to be held on 25 April 2010.

The elections were first postponed to 16 May, and then indefinitely. The parliament was asked to pass a change to the constitution allowing the President to continue its mandate until elections could be organized. Some sources saw the delay in elections as a constitutional coup, and did not expect elections to take place anytime soon. However, elections were held in January and March 2011. Bozizé and his party both won in the elections.

2012–13 conflict

On 10 December 2012, the Séléka CPSK-CPJP-UFDR (Séléka means coalition) seized the towns of N'Délé, Sam Ouandja and Ouadda. Rebels fought with government and allied CPJP troops for over an hour before securing the town of N'Délé. On 27 December, Bozizé requested international assistance to help with the rebellion, in particular from France and the United States. French President François Hollande rejected the plea, saying that the 250 French troops stationed at Bangui M'Poko International Airport are there "in no way to intervene in the internal affairs".

On 11 January 2013, a ceasefire agreement was signed in Libreville, Gabon. The rebels dropped their demand for Bozizé to resign, but he had to appoint a new prime minister from the opposition party by 18 January 2013. On 13 January, Bozizé signed a decree that removed Prime Minister Touadéra from power, as part of the agreement with the rebel coalition. On 17 January, Nicolas Tiangaye was appointed Prime Minister.

By 22 March, however, the rebels had renewed their advance, accusing Bozizé of failing to honor the January ceasefire agreement. They took towns throughout the Central African Republic, including Damara and Bossangoa. They advanced to within 22 kilometers of Bangui, but were halted with an aerial assault from an attack helicopter. However, Nelson N'Djadder, presumed spokesman for the rebels, claimed that they shot down the helicopter.

On 24 March, rebel forces heavily attacked Bangui and took control of major structures, including the presidential palace. Bozizé's family fled across the river to the Democratic Republic of the Congo and then to Yaoundé, the capital of Cameroon, where he was granted temporary refuge. Subsequently, he requested that Benin grant him political asylum.

Kwa Na Kwa announced on 10 August 2015 that Bozizé would return to the country and stand as a candidate in the October 2015 presidential election. On 8 December 2015, the Constitutional Court announced the list of approved presidential candidacies. Bozizé, who was still in exile, was barred from standing. Officially, he was excluded on the grounds that he was not registered on the voter list and because he had agreed not to run again as part of the peace agreement in January 2013. Gunfire was subsequently reported in parts of Bangui, as his supporters reacted angrily to the news. The KNK said that Bozizé's exclusion was "the result of internal and external pressure", with many of his supporters alleging that the French government was involved in the decision.

2019–2020
At the end of 2019 Bozizé returned to CAR and announced his presidential candidacy for upcoming elections. However, on 3 December 2020 the Constitutional Court of CAR ruled that Bozizé did not satisfy the “good morality” requirement for candidates because of an international warrant and United Nations sanctions against him for alleged assassinations, torture and other crimes. Then the government accused Bozizé of plotting a coup that evolved into fullscale civil war.

Notes

References

 
 Aractingi, Jean-Marc (2006), La Politique à mes trousses (Politics at my heels), Paris: Editions l'Harmattan, Central Africa Chapter, 
 
 

 

Heads of state of the Central African Republic
Leaders who took power by coup
Leaders ousted by a coup
Defense ministers of the Central African Republic
Central African Republic exiles
Central African Republic military personnel
Central African Republic people imprisoned abroad
Central African Republic torture victims
1946 births
Living people
Central African Republic Bush War
People of the Central African Republic Civil War
Central African Republic Pentecostals
Prisoners and detainees of Benin
People from Ngounié Province
Heads of government who were later imprisoned